"The Great Escape" is the second single from Boys Like Girls' eponymous debut album and is their first single to chart on the Billboard Hot 100, peaking at 23. The single has been certified platinum and gold by the RIAA.

Background
According to the song's writer Martin Johnson in a lyric feature on Euphonia Online, the lyrical content of the song is about his graduating from high school.

Music video 
The music video was directed by Alan Ferguson. Released in late February 2007, it was added to MTV playlists and received considerable airplay on those channels along with Fuse TV. The video was #1 on MTV's Total Request Live for 9 days in the summer and fall of 2008. It features the band on the road, as well as in concert, while detailing the journey of a group of their high school aged fans on the way to and during their best concert. It goes back and forth between the band and the high schoolers showing their journey as they both make their way to the concert the band will be playing at. The end of the video implies a budding romance between the adult band members and their high school fans.

In popular culture
The song has also appeared as a downloadable track for the Xbox 360 karaoke game, Lips, and featured on the soundtrack of 2K Sports' Top Spin 3. The song is featured in the Nintendo DS version of the game by Activision, Band Hero and was made available as a downloadable track for the Rock Band game in June 2010. The song is featured on the soundtrack to the film The House Bunny. It was also used in promotion for the NBC show Life. The song was used in episode 64 and 154 of Running Man, and was used in episode 189 of Dream Team II. The song is also a playable level in the Nintendo Wii-exclusive video game We Cheer, We Cheer 2.

Track listing 
CD single
 "The Great Escape" (Album Version)
 "Heels Over Head" (Tom Lord-Alge Mix)
 "The Great Escape" (Live)
Bonus Content:
 "The Great Escape" Ringtone
 Wallpaper Image

Charts

Weekly charts

Year-end charts

Certifications

Release history

References

External links 
 

2006 songs
2007 singles
Boys Like Girls songs
Songs written by Sam Hollander
Songs written by Dave Katz
Songs written by Martin Johnson (musician)
Columbia Records singles
Music videos directed by Alan Ferguson (director)